Paul Warren Rieger  (born ) is a former New Zealand local-body politician. He served as mayor of Palmerston North from 1985 to 1998, and was a member of the Horizons Regional Council between 1998 and 2019.

Rieger served on the Council of Massey University between 1987 and 2004.

In the 1992 New Year Honours, Rieger was appointed a Companion of the Queen's Service Order for public services.

References

1930s births
Living people
Mayors of Palmerston North
Members of New Zealand regional councils
Companions of the Queen's Service Order
New Zealand justices of the peace
Year of birth missing (living people)